Patrick Meegan (1922 – 14 November 2012) was an Irish Gaelic footballer who played as a right corner-forward at senior level for the Meath county team. 

Meegan made his first appearance for the team during the 1942 championship and was a regular member of the starting fifteen until his retirement after the 1954 championship. During that time he won two All-Ireland medals, five Leinster medals and two National Football League medals. Meegan was an All-Ireland runner-up on two occasions.

At club level Meegan was a three-time county championship medalist with Syddan.

Honours

Team
Syddan
Meath Senior Football Championship (3): 1951, 1952, 1956
Meath Intermediate Football Championship (1): 1941

Meath
All-Ireland Senior Football Championship (2): 1949, 1954
Leinster Senior Football Championship (5): 1947, 1949, 1951, 1952 (c), 1954
National Football League (2): 1945-46, 1950-51

Leinster
Railway Cup (4): 1945, 1952 (c), 1953 (c), 1954

References

 

1922 births
2012 deaths
Irish farmers
Meath inter-county Gaelic footballers
Leinster inter-provincial Gaelic footballers
Syddan Gaelic footballers
People from Drogheda
Winners of two All-Ireland medals (Gaelic football)